Henri-Léopold Lévy (23 September 1840, Nancy - 29 December 1904, Paris) was a French painter of Jewish ancestry, known primarily for mythological and Biblical subjects.

Biography
He was the son of an interior decorator and embroidery manufacturer. His artistic education began at the École des beaux-arts de Paris, where he worked in the studios of François-Édouard Picot, Alexandre Cabanel and Eugène Fromentin. 

His first exhibit at the Salon came in 1865, where he displayed his portrayal of Hecuba, finding the body of her son, Polydorus of Troy, at the seashore. It brought him a first-class medal. Two years later, he received an award for his version of Jehoash of Judah being saved from the slaughter of his family ordered by Athaliah. In 1869 he was given a prize for his "Hebrew Captive Weeping at the Ruins of Jerusalem". In 1872, after showing his portrait of Herodias, he was named a Chevalier in the Legion of Honor.

In addition to his canvases, he created several murals; notably, scenes from the life of Saint Denis at the Church of Saint-Merri, a "Coronation of Charlemagne" (1881) at the  Panthéon and an "Essay on the Glories of Burgundy" which fills a panel in the State Hall of Burgundy in Dijon.

Despite being a Chevalier, his career suffered from the anti-Semitism that swept France after the Dreyfus Affair and he lost customers by refusing to sign his paintings with a different name. He was, however, able to continue participating in the Salon until 1903. During this time, he took an extended trip to the Middle East with his friend, Fromentin, and produced several Orientalist works. 

He also served as a teacher.

References

Other sources 
 Biographical notes @ the Jewish Encyclopedia
 Biographical notes @ Larousse

External links 

 More works by Lévy @ ArtNet

1840 births
1904 deaths
19th-century French painters
Mythological painters
Religious artists
Jewish painters
Artists from Nancy, France
20th-century French painters